The 1964 FA Cup final was the 83rd final of the FA Cup. It took place on 2 May 1964 at Wembley Stadium and was contested between West Ham United and Preston North End.

West Ham, captained by Bobby Moore and managed by Ron Greenwood, won the match 3–2 to win the FA Cup for the first time. Second Division Preston led twice through Doug Holden and Alex Dawson respectively, with John Sissons and Geoff Hurst equalising for West Ham. Ronnie Boyce then scored the winner for the London club in the 90th minute.

Preston's Howard Kendall became the youngest player to play in a Wembley FA Cup Final, aged 17 years and 345 days. He retained this record until Paul Allen played in the 1980 final for West Ham at the age of 17 years and 256 days.

Road to Wembley

Match details

References

External links
Full video of the match

FA Cup Finals
Final
FA Cup Final 1964
FA Cup Final 1964
FA Cup Final
FA Cup Final